The 2008 Speedway World Cup Final was the fourth and last race of the 2008 Speedway World Cup season. It took place on July 19, 2008 in the Speedway Center in Vojens, Denmark.

Results

Heat details

Heat after heat 
 N.Pedersen, Adams, Holta, Jonsson
 Jaguś, B.Pedersen, Holder, Nermark
 Gollob, Crump, Bjerre, Ljung (X)
 Lindgren, Sullivan, Iversen, Walasek
 Hampel, Andersen, Watt, Davidsson
 N.Pedersen, Gollob, Watt, Lindgren (Fx)
 B.Pedersen, Adams, Davidsson, Walasek
 Hampel, Holder, Jonsson, Bjerre
 Lindgren (6 - joker), Holta, Crump, Iversen
 Jaguś, Andersen, Sullivan, Ljung
 N.Pedersen, Ljung, Walasek, Holder
 Lindgren, Hampel, B.Pedersen, Holder (Fx)
 Davidsson, Bjerre, Holta, Sullivan (e4)
 Jaguś, Jonsson, Iversen, Watt
 Andersen, Gollob, Adams, Nermark
 Davidsson, Jaguś, N.Pedersen, Watt
 Gollob, B.Pedersen, Jonsson, Sullivan (e4)
 Bjerre, Davidsson, Watt, Walasek
 Hampel, Iversen, Adams, Ljung (F4)
 Andersen, Lindgren, Holder, Holta (e4)
 Jonsson, Sullivan, N.Pedersen, Hampel (Fx)
 B.Pedersen, Ljung, Holta, Watt
 Bjerre, Lindgren, Jaguś, Adams
 Iversen, Gollob (4 - joker), Davidsson, Holder (e1)
 Walasek, Jonsson, Andersen, Adams (0 - joker)

References

See also 
 2008 Speedway World Cup
 motorcycle speedway

!